A P Jayasankaran is an Indian politician. He is a member of the All India Anna Dravida Munnetra Kazhagam party. He was elected as a member of Tamil Nadu Legislative Assembly from Attur Constituency in May 2021.

References

Living people
People from Tamil Nadu
Tamil Nadu politicians
All India Anna Dravida Munnetra Kazhagam politicians
Year of birth missing (living people)